A leadership election was held by the Israeli Labor Party party on 9 November 2005. Chairman of the Histadrut Trade union Amir Peretz defeated Deputy Prime Minister and Incumbent leader of the party Shimon Peres.

Background 
In 2001, special elections for the position of prime minister took place after the resignation of Ehud Barak. Barak, then the leader of the Labor party, lost to Ariel Sharon, and subsequently retired from political life. he was replaced by Binyamin Ben-Eliezer, who was subsequently defeated by Amram Mitzna in 2002. Mitzna resigned the next year due to the party's poor performance in the 2003 election. as a result of Mitzna's resignation, the decision was made to appoint party veteran Shimon Peres as interim leader in June 2003, with the intent that he would serve for one year.

In July 2003, members of the Labor Party began talks regarding precise primary dates. Binyamin Ben-Eliezer and his allies wanted to establish a committee to prepare for internal elections, to be held in June 2004. which the party's internal buerau rejected. in September, Peres began negotiations with the One Nation party, led by Amir Peretz, with the hopes of fielding a joint list in the next election. in November, several members of the party, including Dalia Itzik and Avraham Burg, proposed the extension of Peres's term by at least one year. Ben-Eliezer initially opposed both motions, and accused Peres of selling out the party, but reached an agreement with Peres to lengthen his term by a year in February 2004. Labor reached an agreement with One Nation in May 2004, despite Ben-Eliezer's opposition. the two parties later merged in 2005.

In December 2004, the party's central committee scheduled the upcoming primary for June 2005. Peretz announced his intention to run on 12 June. the following month, Labor joined the government of Ariel Sharon. with Peres becoming the Vice Prime Minister. on 26 June 2005, two days before the scheduled primary date, the primary was delayed following the discovery of potential fraud in a recently-conducted party census. following the postponement, Barak dropped out of the race and endorsed Peres on 11 September. Member of the Knesset Matan Vilnai announced his intention to run on 10 October. on 16 October, the Central Committee set the primary date on 9 November. Vilnai dropped out of the race on 6 November after Peres promised to appoint him Minister of Defense in a labor-led government.

Campaign 
Peretz campaigned on a desire to return labor to its socialist roots. he opposed free market reforms and budgetary cuts which he argued hurt israel's poor. in addition, he campaigned for his party's withdrawal from the government at the time.

Peres campaigned on his political experience, and attempted to portray himself as calm and civil.

Before dropping out on 11 September, Barak campaigned against the government of the time. He argued that it was incapable of protecting citizens and vowed to back law enforcement if elected. Barak received endorsements from former leader Amram Mitzna, members of the Knesset Avraham Shochat and Danny Yatom, and Minister of Environmental Protection Shalom Simhon.

Candidates 

 Shimon Peres - former Prime Minister, incumbent leader of the Labor Party, Vice Prime Minister.
 Amir Peretz - chairman of the Histadrut, Member of the Knesset, former leader of the One Nation party.
 Binyamin Ben-Eliezer - Minister of National Infrastructure, former Minister of Defense, former leader of the Labor Party.

Withdrawn 

 Matan Vilnai - Member of the Knesset.
 Ehud Barak - former Prime Minister.

Results

Aftermath 
Peres initially claimed that widespread fraud might have taken place during the primary but met with Peretz and conceded on 11 November. he left the labor party on 30 November to join the newly-formed Kadima party, and was elected President of Israel in 2007. Peretz and the Labor party went on to contest the 2006 election, in which they came in second and won 19 seats, achieving no net change in seats. Peretz was later defeated for re-election as leader of the Labor Party in 2007 by Ehud Barak.

References 

Labor Party leadership election
Israeli Labor Party leadership elections
Israeli Labor Party leadership election
Israeli Labor Party leadership election